In Scottish, Northern English, and Manx folklore, the first-foot is the first person to enter the home of a household on New Year's Day and is seen as a bringer of good fortune for the coming year. Similar practices are also found in Greek,  Vietnamese, and Georgian new year traditions.

Origin 
The origins of first-footing is uncertain, although there may be a connection to the Viking Invasion of the British Isles: "This may go back to the time of Vikings when the arrival of a blond stranger at your door would be the cause of fear and alarm." 

Whenever a public ritual is suppressed many continue it at another date. Many customs of first-footing (bringing coal, knocking on doors, group singing Auld Lang Syne to pass from the old to the new) parallel those of Samhain, the Celtic new year, for which fuel was gathered, food collected by reciting verses door-to-door, and a ritual fire lit to welcome crossing the threshold to the next world. "Quite a degree of transferability of customs across the period between Samhain ... Christmas and New Year. Whether this represents a natural tendency to transfer celebrations that brighten the dull winter months or a concerted religious effort to dissipate or transform wholly pagan festivities remains unclear, but a combination of factors is likely."

Britain

North of England 
The tradition of first-footing and how it is conducted varies from place to place in the North of England. Generally, a tall, dark-haired male is preferred over a man with light hair or even a woman. There are regional variations about the hair colour of the first-foot, although generally they must be a male. In East Yorkshire, the first-footer should be dark-haired, but the North York Moors first-footers should be fair-haired.

Often it is expected that they will bring symbolic gifts, and be given food and drink in return by the inhabitants of the house they visit: The first-foot doesn’t enter the house empty-handed – any first-footers who do arrive empty-handed will bring bad luck with them. Instead, the first-foot should bring a selection of gifts for the household, which can include; a silver coin; shortbread or a black bun; salt; coal; and a drink, usually whisky. They represent prosperity, food, flavour, warmth for the house, and good cheer – the whisky is used to toast the new year.

Scotland 
The practice of first-footing is still common across Scotland and varies from place to place as part of Hogmanay celebrations. The luck that the first-foot brings with him will determine the luck for the household for the rest of the year.

Generally, the first-foot should be a tall dark-haired male who is not already in the house when midnight strikes. In many areas, the first-foot should bring with him symbolic gifts such as coal, coins, whisky, or black buns. Food and drink will be given to the first-foot and any other guests. Often women and light or red haired men are considered very unlucky. In Scotland, first-footing has traditionally been more elaborate than in England, involving subsequent entertainment.

Isle of Man 
On the Isle of Man the practice of first-footing has also been a long held tradition. A. W. Moore in his book Folklore of the Isle of Man described the practice:

Traditionally, young boys would visit the houses in their local area on New Year's Day. They would recite a poem in the Manx language at every house and then a boy with dark hair was considered to be lucky for the household and he was given the best food and drink the inhabitants had to share.

The New Year Blessing in Manx

The New Year Blessing in English

A merry Christmas on ye, and a very good year,
Long life and health to the whole household.
Your life and mirth living together,
Peace and love between women and men.
Goods and wealth, stock and store,
Plenty potatoes and enough herring.
Bread and cheese, butter and beef,
Death, like a mouse, in the stackyard of the barn.
Sleeping safely when you lie,
and the flea’s tooth, may it not be well.

Outside of the British Isles 

In Serbian folklore, the polaznik, polažajnik, polaženik, or radovan, is the first person who visits the family on Christmas Day. Like the first-foot tradition, it is expected that the visit will ensure good luck and well-being for the household in the ensuing year. Often a man or boy is chosen in advance for the visit on Christmas morning. 

There are practices similar to first-footing outside the British Isles. For example, it exists in Sweden, where having a fair-skinned, blond(e) first-foot is considered the highest blessing whereas darker persons are considered bad luck. In a similar Greek tradition called pothariko, also called podariko (from the root pod-, or 'foot'), it is believed that the first person to enter the house on New Year's Eve brings either good or bad luck.  Many households to this day keep this tradition and specially select who first enters the house. After the first-foot, the lady of the house serves the guests with Christmas treats or gives them an amount of money to ensure that good luck will come in the new year. 

A similar tradition exists in the country of Georgia, where the person is called  mekvle (from  kvali – 'footstep', 'footprint', 'trace').

See also
 Polažajnik in Serbian folklore
 House blessing
 Wassailing

References

External links

Recording of John Gell reciting the Manx New Year blessing
Article about first-footing from PR Newswire
Short video about first-footing in Northumbria (1950)

Culture of Georgia (country)
Hogmanay
New Year celebrations
Luck
Scottish folklore
Scottish popular culture
Superstitions of Great Britain
Winter traditions